This is a list of animated films produced in Albania during the 1990s.

Animated films
 Dy vëllezërit (1990)
 Ëndërra që nuk vritet (1990)
 Fantazisti (1990)
 Kënga e fundit (1990)
 Kopshtari (1990)
 Luani dhe miu (1990)
 Mall (1990)
 Mustaqet e mbretit (1990)
 Sa nata dita (1990)
 Talenti i babait (1990)
 Zogu dhe hija e tij (1991)
 Kompozim (1992)
 Kush qesh i fundit (1992)
 Maratona e lavdisë (1992)
 Rekuiem (1992)
 Ujku, ujku (1992)
 Djali dhe Ofi (1993)
 Gjëra që nuk ndryshojnë (1993)
 Gjigandi i vetmuar (1993)
 Trëndafili magjik (1993)
 Biba (1994)
 Ekstremisti (1994)
 I vdekuri dhe i gjalli (1994)
 Kumbari i vdekjes (1994)
 Mbreti i bretkosave (1994)
 Mikesha (1994)
 Ringjallje (1994)
 Triptik (1994)
 Marioneta (1995)
 Dashuri në katër stinë (1996)
 Sizifiane (1996)
 Balada e druvarit plak (1997)
 Bashkë me perëndimin e diellit (1997)
 Lojë e përjetshme (1997)
 Sipas kapeles kokën (1997)

References

Lists of animated films
Lists of Albanian films